Paul Roebling  (March 1, 1934 – July 27, 1994) was an American actor noted for Blue Thunder, Prince of the City and Carolina Skeletons.  In the  1990 Ken Burns PBS documentary The Civil War, Roebling was the voice of Joshua Lawrence Chamberlain and read the famous letter written by Sullivan Ballou. He also directed his wife, Olga Bellin, in Zelda.

Roebling committed suicide on July 27, 1994, in Teec Nos Pos, Arizona. His wife had died from cancer several years earlier.

Roebling was a direct descendant of John Roebling and Washington Roebling, the designers and engineers of the Brooklyn Bridge. In the Ken Burns documentary on the Brooklyn Bridge, Roebling was the voice of Washington Roebling.

Awards 
 Roebling won the 1962 Obie Award for Distinguished Performance by an Actor for his performance in This Side of Paradise.

Filmography

External References

Notes

External links
 
 
 Paul Roebling at Internet Off-Broadway Database

1934 births
1994 deaths
20th-century American male actors
American male film actors
American male stage actors
American male voice actors
Category:Roebling_family
1994 suicides
Suicides in Arizona
Roebling_family